Fanny Elssler is a 1937 German historical drama film directed by Paul Martin and starring Lilian Harvey, Rolf Moebius, and Willy Birgel. It was loosely based on the life of the dancer Fanny Elssler. It was shot at the Babelsberg Studios with location filming in Vienna. The film's sets were designed by the art director Erich Kettelhut.

Plot 
Vienna, around 1830. The very young dancer Fanny Elssler celebrates triumphs. Austria's gray eminence, Prince Metternich, sees the impression she makes on men at a party he gives. He therefore wants to bring the artist together with the powerless Duke of Reichstadt, who as Napoleon II is living in exile in Austria and is the son of Napoleon Bonaparte, but without rulership over France. She should sound him out about any political simulation games and intentions. Metternich is interested in receiving information on how he feels about the Parisian Bonapartists who are currently gripping the country. The Baron Hofrat von Gentz ​​should instruct Fanny in this regard. Gentz himself shows interest in the much younger dancer, but bows to the royal wish. But La Elssler is not so easily manipulated. She sees her reputation as a decent artist at risk and indignantly rejects Gentz's request.

The still very young Duke of Reichstadt does not yet know anything about Metternich's machinations, but he is aware that he is constantly being watched by his protecting power, Austria. One day he meets Fanny Elssler and is immediately charmed by her. For understandable reasons, Napoleon II chose a pseudonym when he first met and introduced himself as Lieutenant Franz von Mödling. Fanny is as enthusiastic about him as he is about her, and both young people fall in love. The relationship between the two matures without the imperial Austrian power brokers suspecting anything of it. It is only during a diplomatic ball given by Prince Metternich that he and his secretary Gentz ​​realize how far the relationship between Fanny and Napoleon II has progressed. Gentz then sends Fanny to Paris under the pretext that an interesting engagement is waiting for her there. You really want to keep the liaison between the two mismatched lovers under control.

Fanny absolutely doesn't want to let go of her lover, so Baron Gentz ​​makes it clear to her that her reunification with the Duke of Reichstadt was nothing more than a political maneuver by the Viennese government. Only now does Fanny show willingness and leave the country for the French capital. In Paris she celebrates great success with her art, but she cannot forget her loved one at home in distant Vienna. The Duke of Reichstadt feels the same way. He escapes his golden cage in Austria and also rushes to Paris to see Fanny again. But her personal happiness is short-lived. In addition, the political unrest in France is increasing more and more. Napoleon Bonaparte's supporters demand that they take back power in the country. Although standing in his father's shadow, his son is willing to do so. But things don't go as planned. Napoleon II and Fanny attend a Bonapartist gathering, which is dissolved by the authorities. Baron Gentz ​​suspects something bad and he turns up at the Duke of Reichstadt to urge him to return to Vienna. He realizes that he is just a plaything of different powers and withers away. The Duke of Reichstadt is only 21 years old.

Cast

References

Bibliography

External links 
 

1937 films
Films of Nazi Germany
German biographical drama films
German historical drama films
1930s biographical drama films
1930s historical drama films
1930s German-language films
Films directed by Paul Martin
Films set in the 1820s
Films set in the 1830s
UFA GmbH films
Cultural depictions of Klemens von Metternich
Cultural depictions of dancers
Cultural depictions of Austrian women
Films shot in Vienna
Films set in Vienna
German black-and-white films
Films shot at Babelsberg Studios
1937 drama films
Films set in the Austrian Empire
1930s German films